Kettering railway station serves the town of Kettering in Northamptonshire, England.

History 

The station was opened in May 1857 by the Midland Railway, on a line linking the Midland to the Great Northern Railway at Hitchin. Later, the Midland gained its own London terminus at St Pancras railway station. In 1857, the leather trade was in recession and so over half of Kettering's population was on poor relief; the railway enabled the town to sell its products over a much wider area and restored it to prosperity.
 
The original station with a single platform was designed by Charles Henry Driver, with particularly fine 'pierced grill' cast ironwork on the platform. In 1858, it was reported that the station was now lit by gas lamps with gas supplied from the town mains. It was also reported that the line was one of the very few without telegraphic wires.

From 1866, the station was also the terminus of the Midland cross country branch line from  via St Ives and Huntingdon, until closure in June 1959.

In 1879, the line was quadrupled. New fast lines were built to the west of the original slow lines. Three new platforms were built: numbers 2 and 3 on an island between the fast and slow lines, with number 4 to the west of the fast lines. The Midland Railway commissioned single-storey weather-boarded waiting rooms and canopies, with cast-iron columns and spandrels for the island platforms 2 and 3 and platform 4, to match those designed in 1857 by Charles Henry Driver.

From 1879 (for freight) and 1880 (for passengers), Kettering was also a junction for the direct line from Kettering to Nottingham, via Oakham and Melton Mowbray. This closed to passengers in 1966, but was left as a through route for freight (as far as Melton Mowbray only from 1968.) For later services on this line, see "Corby Services" below.

Other additions included a two-bay engine shed, erected by C. Deacon & Company for the Midland Railway, at the north end of the forecourt around 1875 and a goods shed with offices, built at the south end around 1894.

The Midland Railway replaced the main station buildings on platform 1 between 1895 and 1898 with a new booking hall, booking office, parcels office and refreshment room. These current buildings may be by Charles Trubshaw. It is regarded as one of the best remaining examples of Midland architecture.

In the 1970s, the glass canopies became a maintenance headache for British Rail, who proposed to remove the tops of the cast iron columns and replace the glass canopies with plastic sheeting.  Kettering Civic Society objected to the plans and the canopies and columns were reprieved, later to be sympathetically restored by Railtrack in 2000.

London, Midland and Scottish Railway
Until the line through Buxton was closed in the Beeching era, the  'main lines' were those from London to Manchester, carrying named expresses such as The Palatine. Express trains to Leeds and Scotland, such as the Thames-Clyde Express, generally used the Erewash Valley Line then on to the Settle and Carlisle Line. Expresses to Edinburgh, such as The Waverley, travelled through Corby and Nottingham.

Stationmasters

William Waterson ca. 1858
W.H. Bruxby until 1860
Elias D. Barber from 1860 (formerly station master at Ilkeston)
George Oliver King ca. 1868
Henry Simms ca. 1871 - 1874
Frederick Marlow 1874 - 1890 (afterwards station master at Leeds)
William Brown 1890 - 1891 (formerly station master at Bingley, afterwards station master at Leeds)
Frederick Marlow 1891 - 1898
John Henry Garton 1898 - 1903 (afterwards station master at Gloucester)
Charles William Jones 1903 - 1919 (formerly station master at Great Malvern, afterwards station master at Leicester)
Arthur Willsher 1919 - 1926
William E. Coates 1926 - 1939 (formerly station master at Loughborough)
A. Johnson 1939 - 1942 (formerly station master at Kentish Town, afterwards station master at Barking)
R.W. Ellson ca. 1943
A.D. Prime ca. 1949
L.C. Panter until 1957
J.A. Kind from 1958

Corby services 
Just north of Kettering, on Engineer's Line Reference SPC2 (St Pancras to Chesterfield), is Glendon Junction for the Oakham to Kettering Line. This leads through Corby to Manton Junction, where it joins the Leicester to Peterborough Line.  This historically provided an alternative route for expresses to Nottingham via Old Dalby.

Passenger services were withdrawn from this line in the 1960s, though it remained open for freight. In 1987, Network SouthEast experimentally introduced a shuttle service between Kettering and a new station in the nearby town of Corby. The service was withdrawn a few years later. Corby was often regarded as being the largest town in western Europe with no railway station. East Midlands Trains, and Midland Mainline before it, was committed through its franchise to run a shuttle bus from Corby to Kettering station. Occasionally the line is used as a diversionary route when the route between Kettering and Leicester is closed.

The new station at Corby was originally planned to open in December 2008, but this was delayed until extra trains were acquired. It eventually opened on 23 February 2009, initially served by one return train to London St Pancras per day, operated by East Midlands Trains. Full service, with 13 daily returns to London, started on 27 April 2009.  The service provided hourly trains between Corby and London St Pancras International until the May 2021 timetable change when the service was increased to half-hourly under the new franchise holder Abellio.

Services 
All services at Kettering are operated by East Midlands Railway under its InterCity and Connect brands.

As of May 2021, services are operated using Class 180 Adelante and Class 222 Meridian DMUs for InterCity services and Class 360 EMUs for Connect services.

The typical off-peak service in trains per hour is:
 2 tph to 
 2 tph to  via 

There is also a limited service to  although most Sheffield-bound trains pass through the station without stopping.

One of these terminates at Kettering and the other continues to London St Pancras.

Facilities 
Kettering is staffed during operational hours (05:00-00:30); it is locked and inaccessible outside of these times. The station is equipped with CCTV cameras, which are monitored locally and at the town council offices.

From 2009, Kettering became a penalty fare station; a valid ticket or permit to travel must be shown on request.

Lifts to all platforms.
Two pay and display car parks (for charges see http://www.nationalrail.co.uk/stations/ket/details.html).
Waiting rooms on all platforms. Platform 4 has a painting of a girl looking into a box, artist unknown.
Pumpkin Café.
Accessible toilet and baby change.
Stagecoach X1 bus to Corby
FastTicket machine
Food vending machines.
Payphones.
Taxis.

The station is included in the PlusBus scheme, where bus travel can be added to train tickets for a small additional charge. Through fares were made available from 68 UK towns and cities to Paris, Brussels and other destinations in France and Belgium in late 2007; these must be booked through Eurostar.

The station formerly had a nightclub in the basement of the station building. The nightclub has recently had a licence granted, which shall re-open and as a bar and music venue.

A subway and barrow crossing was used at the station to access the various platforms, until the lifts and stairs were constructed in the 1990s. The former station master's flat has remained available to rent for several years.

Future 
It was originally planned that all platforms would be extended by up to 50 metres by 2012, to allow longer trains to be accommodated. This was not actioned until years later, as the platforms were extended by August 2020 in preparation for the May 2021 timetable change. This is because 21 new 4-carriage Class 360 EMU units are occasionally used in formations of threes, equivalent to 12 carriages per train, and require the extra platform length to fit fully.

Until very recently, the railway through Kettering was not electrified, this changed in  May 2021, when Class 360 EMUs began running on the newly electrified section between Bedford and Corby, along its route between London St Pancras and Corby. Diesel Class 222 Meridians and 180 Adelantes were cascaded in order to solely run the inter-city services north to Nottingham, Sheffield, Derby, Leeds and Lincoln; these services continue to call frequently at Kettering.

Kettering is also now a major interchange for the south end of the Midland Main Line. In the May 2021 timetable change, the EMR inter-city services stopped calling at Wellingborough, Bedford, Luton and Luton Airport Parkway. Passengers from these stations now have to change at Kettering in order to take an EMR inter-city train north to destinations such as Leicester, Nottingham and Derby.

Destinations

Major urban centres 
Many of the UK's major cities can be reached with one or two changes. Many continental cities can be reached via one change at St Pancras International.

The following places can be reached directly from Kettering (Journey times approximate)
London (St Pancras International) - 45–65 minutes
Leicester- 23–26  mins
Derby - 55 mins
Nottingham - 55 mins
Sheffield - 1 hour 25 mins
Luton - 40 mins

The following places are reached directly from Kettering at certain times only:
Doncaster - 1 hour 45 mins (Evenings)
Wakefield - 1 hour 55 mins (Evenings)
Leeds - 2 hours 15 mins (Peak times)
York - 2 hours 30 mins (1 journey each way - weekends only)

The following places can be reached from Kettering by changing once (Journey times approximate)
Stoke-on-Trent, Crewe - Change at Derby
Edinburgh, Newcastle - Change at Sheffield or Derby
Manchester, Liverpool - Change at Nottingham
Inverness - Change at York
Birmingham - Change at Leicester

Passengers are able to travel to Paris and Brussels by changing at St Pancras Int. East Midlands Railway has said it will introduce earlier journeys to London to allow passengers to arrive in Paris or Brussels before 9am.

Local important centres 
The following places can be reached directly from Kettering (Journey times approximate)
Bedford - 20 mins
Corby - 8 mins
Loughborough - 36 mins
Market Harborough - 10 mins
Wellingborough - 7/9 mins

The following places can be reached from Kettering by changing once (Journey times approximate)
Bradford, Halifax - change at Leeds
Norwich - Change at Nottingham
Huddersfield, Rotherham, Hull, Grimsby - Change at Sheffield
Grantham, Skegness, Boston, Lincoln Central - Change at Nottingham
Mansfield - Change at Nottingham
 (Worksop) - change at Nottingham

Tickets 
The ticket office is open from 06:00 until 20:30, seven days a week. At all other times a vending machine is available.

Ticket gates are currently in the process of being installed at Kettering station as of March 2022 and should be operational soon.

See also
 Midland Main Line railway upgrade

References

External links 

Buildings and structures in Kettering
Railway stations in Northamptonshire
DfT Category C2 stations
Former Midland Railway stations
Railway stations in Great Britain opened in 1857
Railway stations served by East Midlands Railway
Charles Henry Driver railway stations
Grade II listed buildings in Northamptonshire
Charles Trubshaw railway stations
1857 establishments in England